The 2009 Total 24 Hours of Spa was the 62nd running of the Spa 24 Hours and the fourth round of the 2009 FIA GT Championship season. The race took place at Circuit de Spa-Francorchamps between 25 and 26 July 2009. Joining the FIA GT Championship competitors were cars from numerous national GT series as well as competitors from the FIA GT3 European Championship. This was the last time GT1 machinery was eligible for the race, as well as the last Spa 24 Hours that was part of the FIA GT Championship.

PK Carsport's Anthony Kumpen, Mike Hezemans, Kurt Mollekens, and Jos Menten won the race for the second time for Corvette, leading a Vitaphone Racing Maserati and a Phoenix Racing Audi for the overall podium. The GT2 category was won by AF Corse Ferrari, while the Ford GT of Matech GT Racing won amongst G3 entries.

Report

Qualifying
Qualifying's three sessions were hampered by rain, with the only dry track time coming in the early minutes of the first session. The three Vitaphone Maseratis were able to quickly grab the top positions before the rains came, locking them into that position as no improvements were able to be made in any of the latter wet sessions.

The No. 120 Rossa Corsa Ferrari and No. 11 Full Speed Racing Saleen were required to start from pit lane after they both changed engines following qualifying. The two PMB Motorsports Porsches did not participate in any of the three qualifying sessions and also had to start from pit lane.

Qualifying results
Pole position winners in each class are marked in bold.

Race
Victory in the race went to the number 4 PK Carsport Chevrolet Corvette C6.R GT1, which finished 11 laps ahead of the second placed Maserati MC12 GT1 of Vitaphone Racing Team DHL. Phoenix Racing, AF Corse and Matech GT Racing took class victories. 

Following the race, Porsche revealed that all of their cars participating in the GT2 category had used steel sleeves which did not match the homologation papers for the 997 GT3-RSR.  The FIA later disqualified all Porsches from the GT2 category for this violation, amending the final race results.

Race result
Class winners in bold.  Cars failing to complete 75% of winner's distance marked as Not Classified (NC).

References

Spa 24 Hours
Spa
Spa 24 Hours